Salvia harleyana is a subshrub that is endemic to the Serra do Cipó area in Minas Gerais state in Brazil. It grows in savanna and gallery forest at approximately  elevation.

The specific epithet honors botanist Raymond Harley, Royal Botanic Gardens, Kew.

Notes

harleyana
Flora of Brazil